Three referendums were held in Switzerland during 1965. The first two were held on 28 February on measures against prices rises in the banking and housebuilding sectors, with both approved by voters. The third was held on 16 May on a federal law on dairy products and edible fats, and was also approved by voters.

Results

February: Measures against prices rises in the banking sector

February: Measures against prices rises in the housebuilding sector

May: Federal law on dairy and edible fat products

References

1965 referendums
1965 in Switzerland
Referendums in Switzerland